Anguksa is a Buddhist temple in Pyongsong, North Korea.

Anguksa may also refer to:
Anguksa (Pohang), a Buddhist temple in Pohang, South Korea
Anguksa (Seoul), a shrine in Nakseongdae, Seoul, South Korea